Petrocephalus is a genus of ray-finned fish in the family Mormyridae. All the fish species of this genus are endemic to Africa.

Species
There are currently 46 recognized species in this genus:

 Petrocephalus ansorgii Boulenger 1903 (Agberi mormyrid)
 Petrocephalus arnegardi Lavoué & Sullivan 2014  (Arnegard mormyrid)
 Petrocephalus balayi Sauvage 1883 (Ogooue River mormyrid)
 Petrocephalus balteatus Rochebrune 1885 (Churchill snoutfish)
 Petrocephalus bane (Lacépède, 1803)
 Petrocephalus binotatus Pellegrin 1924 (Ikengo mormyrid)
 Petrocephalus boboto Lavoué & Sullivan 2014  (Boboto mormyrid)
 Petrocephalus bovei (Valenciennes 1847) (baby whale)
 Petrocephalus catostoma (Günther 1866) (Churchill)
 Petrocephalus christyi Boulenger 1920 (Lindi mormyrid)
 Petrocephalus congicus L. R. David & Poll 1937 (Mukishi River mormyrid)
 Petrocephalus cunganus Boulenger 1910 (Cuanza River mormyrid)
 Petrocephalus degeni Boulenger 1906 (Katonga River mormyrid)
 Petrocephalus frieli Lavoué 2012  (Luapula River mormyrid)
 Petrocephalus gliroides (Vinciguerra 1897) (Ganana River mormyrid)
 Petrocephalus grandoculis Boulenger 1920
 Petrocephalus haullevillii Boulenger 1912
 Petrocephalus hutereaui (Boulenger 1913) (Uele mormyrid)
 Petrocephalus keatingii Boulenger 1901 (Fashoda mormyrid)
 Petrocephalus leo Lavoué, 2016  (Kotto elephantfish)
 Petrocephalus levequei Bigorne & Paugy 1990 (Sierra Leone elephantfish)
 Petrocephalus longianalis B. J. Kramer I. R. Bills, P. H. Skelton & Wink 2012  (Lufubu River mormyrid)
 Petrocephalus longicapitis B. J. Kramer, I. R. Bills, P. H. Skelton & Wink 2012  (Katima Mulilo mormyrid)
 Petrocephalus magnitrunci B. J. Kramer, I. R. Bills, P. H. Skelton & Wink 2012  (Okavango mormyrid)
 Petrocephalus magnoculis B. J. Kramer, I. R. Bills, P. H. Skelton & Wink 2012  (Cunene River mormyrid)
 Petrocephalus mbossou Lavoué, Sullivan & Arnegard 2010 (Mbossou mormyrid)
 Petrocephalus microphthalmus Pellegrin 1908 (smallhead mormyrid)
 Petrocephalus odzalaensis Lavoué, Sullivan & Arnegard 2010 (Odzala mormyrid)
 Petrocephalus okavangensis B. J. Kramer, I. R. Bills, P. H. Skelton & Wink 2012  (Thoage River mormyrid)
 Petrocephalus pallidomaculatus Bigorne & Paugy, 1990 (Bamako mormyrid)
 Petrocephalus pellegrini Poll 1941 (Nuon mormyrid)
 Petrocephalus petersi B. J. Kramer, I. R. Bills, P. H. Skelton & Wink 2012  (Zambezi mormyrid)
 Petrocephalus pulsivertens Lavoué, Sullivan & Arnegard 2010 (Odzala mormyrid)
 Petrocephalus sauvagii (Boulenger 1887) (Sauvage's mormyrid)
 Petrocephalus schoutedeni Poll 1954 (Yangambi mormyrid)
 Petrocephalus similis Lavoué 2011  (Sanaga mormyrid)
 Petrocephalus simus Sauvage 1879 (roundnose mormyrid)
 Petrocephalus soudanensis Bigorne & Paugy 1990 (Loutou mormyrid)
 Petrocephalus squalostoma (Boulenger 1915) (Lukinda mormyrid)
 Petrocephalus steindachneri Fowler 1958 (Msola mormyrid)
 Petrocephalus stuhlmanni Boulenger 1909 (Kingani mormyrid)
 Petrocephalus sullivani Lavoué, C. D. Hopkins & Kamdem Toham 2004 (Sullivan's mormyrid)
 Petrocephalus tanensis Whitehead & Greenwood 1959  (Tana-churchill)
 Petrocephalus tenuicauda (Steindachner 1894) (Junk mormyrid)
 Petrocephalus valentini Lavoué, Sullivan & Arnegard 2010 (Lekoli mormyrid)
 Petrocephalus wesselsi B. J. Kramer & van der Bank 2000 (Southern Churchill)
 Petrocephalus zakoni Lavoué, Sullivan & Arnegard 2010 (Zakon mormyrid)

References

Weakly electric fish
Mormyridae
Fish of Africa
Ray-finned fish genera